Årøya is an island of northern Norway, located off the coast of Alta, in Troms og Finnmark county. There is a ferry connection between the village of Kongshus on Årøya and Mikkelsby on the mainland.

References

Islands of Troms og Finnmark
Alta, Norway